Brachmia brunneolineata is a moth in the family Gelechiidae. It was described by Henry Legrand in 1966. It is found on the Seychelles, where it has been recorded from Mahé and Silhouette.

The larvae feed on Calophyllum inophyllum.

References

Moths described in 1966
Brachmia
Moths of Africa